Deben Bhattacharya (1921–2001) was a Bengali radio producer, record producer, ethnomusicologist, anthropologist, documentary filmmaker, photographer, translator, poet, writer, broadcaster, lecturer, and folk music consultant. He produced over 100 records, 23 films and published more than a dozen books in his lifetime and much of his work was carried out under the auspices of UNESCO.

Early life
Bhattacharya was born to an old Bengali Brahmin family that was settled in Benares for over 130 years. As a young man, he was influenced by the work of English poet Lewis Thompson, which prompted him to move to England, where he worked for the BBC as a radio producer. Knowing a lot of Indians in London, he started to record Indian musicians on a Baird tape recorder. When Bhattacharya had the idea to do field recordings in India, he was met with a financial dilemma of needing £80 for the tape recorder, £20 for the transformer, £25 for 20 blank tapes, plus about £60 for a one way boat ticket to Bombay. Sunday Wilson – a producer for the overseas service, commissioned him for six five-minute programmes, which garnered £30.6.0. Weeks after that, the poet Stephen Spender, who had started his new magazine Encounter, approached Bhattacharya to write an article on Indian poetry and advance him on two further articles. The London based company Argo Records Ltd. that specialized in classical music also advanced £25 and paid for the Gaumont-British machine, and the tapes against future royalties. He returned with enough material to make four or five records, and one of them was published, called "Songs from Bombay". This led to a trip through the Middle East, recording music in every country, as well as other projects.

Career
Bhattacharya continued to earn international recognition as an expert on ethnic folk music, dance and poetry and was employed to help teach ethnic music and bring ethnic musicians to Sweden. Living for periods of time in London and Stockholm he began making films in 1962 when his BBC Third Programme producer, Robert Leighton, introduced him to David Attenborough, who was then an executive at BBC Television. When Bhattacharya told him that he would be going to India with an experienced cameraman, Attenborough offered him £1,000 to help with his expenses. Upon his return, the BBC edited the material into two films: Kathakali, the classical dance drama of South India, and Storytellers From Rajastan. Following this, Swedish Television gave him money to make a film in Hungary. This led to film making in Romania, Tibet, China, Bangladesh, Nepal and many other countries. Towards the end of his career, Bhattacharya had archived over 16,000 photographs related to his various projects.

Partial filmography
 Waves of Joy: Anandalahari, director and producer
 The Chanting Lama, director
 Silk and Strings: Taiwan, director
 Raga,director
 Painted Ballad of India, director
 Krishna in Spring, director
 Jesus and the Fisherman, director
 Faces of the Forest: The Santals of West Bengal, director and producer
 Echoes From Tibet, director
 Buddha and the Rice-Planters, director
 Ecstatic Circle: Turkey, director (1972)
 Adaptable Kingdom: Music and Dance in Nepal, director (1972)
 The Land of Smiles: Thailand, director and producer (1973)
 Bali: The Isle of Temples, director and producer (1973)
 Chinese Opera, director (1983)
 Uighurs on the Silk Route, director (1985)
 The Cosmic Dance of Shiva, director (1986)

Partial discography
 Music on the Desert Road: A Sound Travelogue by Deben Bhattacharya – Angel Records, recorded 1955, released 1958
 Bedouins of the Middle East, 1955–60 – ARC Music
 The Living Tradition: Songs and Dance from Nepal by Deben Bhattacharya – The Decca Record Company, released 1974
 Sounds of West Sahara: Mauritania – ARC Music, recorded 1978, released 2004
 Maqams of Syria – ARC Music, released 2001
 River Songs of Bangladesh – ARC Music, released 2001
 Treasures in Sound – India – UA International, 1967
 Classical Ragas of India – Philips and Limelight Records, 1968
 Santūr, Tunbūk, And Tār (Music and Drum Rhythm of Iran) – Philips  and Limelight Records, 1968
 Inde: Musique populaire du Rajasthan (Music From the Indian Desert) – Disques Ocora, OCR 47, recorded January 1968
 The Living Tradition – Music From Turkey – Argo Records Ltd., 1968
 2 Ragas – Sveriges Radio, 1969
 The Living Tradition – Music From Iran – Argo, 1971
 The Living Tradition – Songs of Krishna – Argo, 1971
 The Living Tradition – Music From Bangladesh – Argo, 1972
 The Living Tradition – Songs and Dances From Macedonia – Argo, 1972
 Folkmusik Från Rumänien – Caprice Records, 1972
 Musique folklorique du monde: Yougoslavie – Musidisc
 Musique folklorique du monde: Iran – Musidisc
 Musique folklorique du monde: Hongrie – Musidisc
 Sacred Temple Music of Tibet – ARC Music, 1998
  Religious Music - Holy Land / Terre Sainte - 	Nord Sud Music – NSCD 1180

Books

References

External links
 Interview with record producer Kevin Daly
 The World Jukebox field recordings
 

1921 births
2001 deaths
Bengali writers
British radio producers
BBC radio producers
Indian documentary filmmakers
Ethnomusicologists
British documentary filmmakers
British broadcasters
British record producers
British male poets
20th-century British poets
20th-century British translators
20th-century British male writers
20th-century musicologists
20th-century British businesspeople
Male non-fiction writers